A magnetogravity wave is a type of plasma wave. A magnetogravity wave is an acoustic gravity wave which is associated with fluctuations in the background magnetic field. In this context, gravity wave refers to a classical fluid wave, and is completely unrelated to the relativistic gravitational wave.

Examples 

Magnetogravity waves are found in the corona of the Sun.

See also
 Wave
 Plasma
 Magnetosonic wave
 Helioseismology

References

Astrophysics
Plasma physics
Waves